Lubaina Himid  (born 1954) is a British artist and curator. She is a professor of contemporary art at the University of Central Lancashire. Her art focuses on themes of cultural history and reclaiming identities.

Himid was one of the first artists involved in the UK's Black Art movement in the 1980s and continues to create activist art which is shown in galleries in Britain, as well as worldwide. Himid was appointed MBE in June 2010 "for services to Black Women's Art", won the Turner Prize in 2017 and was promoted to CBE in the 2018 Queen's Birthday Honours "for services to Art."

Early life and education 
Himid was born in Zanzibar Sultanate (then a British protectorate, now part of Tanzania) in 1954 and moved to Britain with her mother, a textile designer, following the death of her father when she was just four months old. She attended the Wimbledon College of Art, where she studied Theatre Design, obtaining her B.A. in 1976. She received her master's degree in Cultural History from the Royal College of Art in London in 1984.

Curatorial work
Himid has organized several exhibitions of work by black women artists, including Black Woman Time Now at the Battersea Arts Centre in London (1983) and Five Black Women, an exhibition in 1983 at the Africa Centre, London. Among other exhibitions she has curated are: Into the Open (1984), The Thin Black Line (Institute of Contemporary Arts, 1985), Unrecorded Truths (1986), Out There Fighting (1987), New Robes for MaShulan (1987), and State of the Art (1987). Into the Open, presented at Mappin Art Gallery in Sheffield, was widely regarded as the first major exhibit of the new generation of black British artists. Naming the Money (2004), presents an exuberant crowd of 100 enslaved people, in the roles they played in the princely courts of Europe: everything from dog-trainers, toy makers and mapmakers to dancing masters, musicians and painters. They were bought as the "property" of wealthy Europeans at a time when Africans were regarded as units of currency and black servants were status symbols. Encountering these victims of 18th-century human trafficking, the visitor learns their original identities, as well as those imposed on them.

Critical reception
Himid considers that critical views changed after her work was shown by the Hollybush Gardens gallery in London 2013. Prior to this date she had exhibited in the UK but not internationally or in the largest UK institutions.

Reviewing an updated version of Himid's 2004 work Naming the Money for The Daily Telegraph in February 2017, Louisa Buck noted: "Himid's work has long been concerned with black creativity, history and identity and this animated throng represents the Africans who were brought to Europe as slave servants. There are drummers, dog trainers, dancers, potters, cobblers, gardeners and players of the viola da gamba, all decked out in vivid versions of 17th century costume. Labels on their backs identify each individual, giving both their original African names and occupations as well those imposed by their new European owners, and these poignant texts also form part of an evocative soundtrack, interspersed with snatches of Cuban, Irish, Jewish and African music."

Awards and honours

Board memberships 
Himid has held positions on many boards and panels. She is on the board of trustees for the Lowry Arts Centre Manchester. Additionally, she is a board member for Arts Council England Visual Arts, Creative Partnerships East Lancs and Arts Council England North West. Previous board memberships include Matt's Gallery, London (2002–05), and Tate Liverpool Council (2000, 2005). From 1985 until 1987 Himid was on the Greater London Arts Association Visual Arts Panel.

Awards
Himid was appointed MBE in the June 2010 Birthday Honours "for services to Black Women's Art".

In 2017 Himid became the first black woman to win the Turner Prize. She was the oldest person to be nominated for the prize since the rules changed to allow nominations of artists over the age of 50. There were, however, older nominees in the 1980s, before the age limit was introduced in 1994.

Apollo magazine named Himid as 2017 Artist of the Year.

Himid was promoted to CBE in 2018 "for services to Art."

Himid was elected a Royal Academician in 2018.

Notable works 
 We Will Be (wood, paint, drawing pins, wool, collage, 1983)
 Bone in the China: success to the Africa Trade (installation, c. 1985)
 Revenge: a masque in five tableaux (multipart installation, 1991–92)
 Zanzibar (series of paintings, 1999)
 Plan B (series of paintings, 1999–2000)
 Swallow Hard: the Lancaster Dinner Service (painted ceramics, 2007)
 Negative Positives (series of graphic works, 2007– )
 Kangas (associated works on paper etc., various dates)
 Le Rodeur (series of paintings, 2016)

Public collections
Himid's work is in many public collections, including Tate, Victoria & Albert Museum, Whitworth Art Gallery, Arts Council England, Manchester Art Gallery, International Slavery Museum, Liverpool, Walker Art Gallery, Birmingham City Art Gallery, Bolton Art Gallery, New Hall, Cambridge, and the Harris Museum and Art Gallery, Preston.

Solo exhibitions 
 GA Fashionable Marriage, Pentonville Gallery, London (1986)
 ''The Ballad of the Wing'', Chisenhale Gallery, London (1989), and City Museum and Art Gallery, Stoke-on-Trent (1989)
 Lubaina Himid: Revenge, Rochdale Art Gallery, Rochdale (1992)
 Plan B and Zanzibar, Tate St. Ives (1999)
 Inside The Invisible, St. Jørgens Museum, Bergen, Norway (2001)
 Double Life, Bolton Museum (2001)
 Naming the Money, Hatton Gallery, Newcastle upon Tyne (2004)
 Swallow, Judges' Lodgings, Lancaster (2006)
 Swallow Hard, Judges' Lodgings, Lancaster (2007)
 Talking On Corners Speaking In Tongues, Harris Museum, Preston, Lancashire (2007)
 Kangas and Other Stories, Peg Alston Gallery, New York City (2008)
 Jelly Mould Pavilion, Sudley House, Liverpool and National Museums Liverpool (2010)
 Tailor Striker Singer Dandy, Platt Gallery of Costume, Manchester (2011)
 Invisible Strategies, Modern Art Oxford (2016–2017)
 Warp and Weft, Firstsite, Colchester (2017)
 Our Kisses are Petals, Baltic Centre for Contemporary Art, Gateshead (2018)
 Solo show at Tate Modern, London, November (2021 - 2022)

See also
 Marina Abramović
 Bay Garnett
 Diana Chire
 Women in the art history field

References

External links 
 Official website
 Jelly Pavilion
 National Life Stories: Artists Lives: Lubaina Himid. Interviewed by Anna Dyke, British Library Sound Archive.
 Lubaina Himid at Art UK

1954 births
20th-century British women artists
21st-century British women artists
Academics of the University of Central Lancashire
Alumni of the Royal College of Art
Alumni of Wimbledon College of Arts
Black British artists
British art curators
British contemporary artists
British installation artists
British women curators
British women painters
Living people
Members of the Order of the British Empire
Royal Academicians
Tanzanian emigrants to the United Kingdom
Turner Prize winners
Women art historians
Zanzibari people